Elections to Peterborough City Council took place on 3 May 2018. This was on the same day as other local elections across the United Kingdom.

Results Summary

Following the 2016 election, two councillors from Gunthorpe ward left the Liberal Democrat group to sit as Independents.

|-bgcolor=#F6F6F6
| colspan=2 style="text-align: right; margin-right: 1em" | Total
| style="text-align: right;" | 60
| colspan=5 |
| style="text-align: right;" | 41,214
| style="text-align: right;" | 
|-
|colspan="11" bgcolor=""|
|-
| style="background:"|
| colspan="10"| Conservative gain from No overall control

Ward results

Bretton

Central

Dogsthorpe

East

No Liberal candidate as previous (-6.6).

Eye, Thorney & Newborough

No Independent candidate as previous (-20.5).

Fletton & Stanground

Fletton & Woodston

No Independent (-16.7) or TUSC (-4.9) candidates as previous.

Gunthorpe

Hampton Vale

Hargate & Hempsted

North

Orton Longueville

Orton Waterville

No UKIP candidate as previous (-18.5).

Park

No UKIP candidate as previous (-8.7).

Paston & Walton

Ravensthorpe

Stanground South

Werrington

By-elections

Orton Longueville

References

2018
2018 English local elections